The  is a type of 4-6-2 steam locomotive built in Japan from 1937 to 1947. A total of 201 Class C57 locomotives were built and designed by Hideo Shima . Another 14 Class C57 locomotives were built for export to Taiwan in 1942 and 1953.

The class was withdrawn from regular passenger service in December 1975. The locomotives were numbered C57 1-C57 201 in Japan the TRA CT270 were numbered CT271-CT284

Preserved examples and Static Display
, 32 Class C57 locomotives have been preserved in Japan, of which two, C57 1 and C57 180, are preserved in working order.

In Taiwan, locomotive number CT273 is preserved in working order.

C57 1

As of 2014, C57 1 was operated by JR West and based at Shimonoseki Depot. As of 2018, it makes regular runs on the Yamaguchi line between Shin-Yamaguchi and Tsuwano The service was suspended following the July 2018 heavy rains, with C57 1 making guest appearance as the leisure train locomotive at the Kyoto Railway Museum during the forced break. The service is set to resume at the end of September 2018.

C57 180

CT271
CT271 was imported to Taiwan in 1943 as C57 1, and renumbered CT271 in 1949. Although involved in an accident in 1957, it was repaired and returned to service until it was withdrawn in 1983 and stored at a roundhouse in Chiayi until 1991 when the roundhouse was demolished. Keelung City applied to Taiwan Railways for preservation of CT271, and it was returned to Keelung Station in June 1991 and moved to Lover Lake Park, where it was publicly unveiled on October 25, 1994. Restoration of CT271 began in 2014 and completed in 2015.

CT273
CT273 was imported to Taiwan in 1943 as C57 3, and renumbered CT273. It was withdrawn in 1983, and restored by the Taiwan Railway Administration in June 2014.

See also
 Japan Railways locomotive numbering and classification
JNR Class C55
JNR Class C59

References

1067 mm gauge locomotives of Japan
Steam locomotives of Japan
Steam locomotives of Taiwan
4-6-2 locomotives
Preserved steam locomotives of Japan
Railway locomotives introduced in 1937
Passenger locomotives